Montereau may refer to:

 Montereau, Loiret, municipality in the Loiret department, France
 Montereau-Fault-Yonne, municipality in the Seine-et-Marne department, France
 Battle of Montereau, 1814
 Gare de Montereau, the railway station of Montereau-Fault-Yonne
 Montereau-sur-le-Jard, municipality in the Seine-et-Marne department, France